Pseudoclanis canui is a moth of the family Sphingidae. It occurs on the island of Príncipe, in the Gulf of Guinea. The species was first described by Philippe Darge in 1991.

See also
Pseudoclanis tomensis - a species of the same genus found on the island of São Tomé

References

Further reading
Darge, P. (1991). "Lépidoptères Sphingidae des îles du Golfe de Guinée". [Lepidoptera: Sphingidae of the Gulf of Guinea Islands]. Bulletin de la Société entomologique de Mulhouse. 47 (4): 62–64.

External links

Pseudoclanis
Moths described in 1991
Fauna of Príncipe
Endemic moths of São Tomé and Príncipe